Alessandro Luparini (born 10 March 1993) is an Italian footballer who most recently played for Olympia Agnonese.

Biography
Born in Spoleto, Umbria region, Luparini started his career at the Tuscan club Siena. He was a player for the Allievi under-16/17 team in the 2008–09 season. In summer 2010, he was signed by Foligno in a temporary deal. He played for the reserve team, and twice in 2010–11 Lega Pro Prima Divisione. In June 2011, Foligno signed Luparini outright.

In October 201,2 Luparini left for his hometown club Spoleto. He played 19 times in 2012–13 Serie D.

In July 201,3 Luparini was signed by Parma. He was loaned to Serie C1 club Gubbio along with other Parma team mates such as the forwards Caccavallo, Cocuzza, Russo and Sandomenico.

On 16 July 2014, the loan was renewed. Gubbio also signed Domini, Casiraghi, Bentoglio and Manganelli on the same day.

On 30 January 2015, Luparini left for A.S. Melfi, with Leandro Campagna returned to Parma.

References

External links
 AIC profile (data by football.it) 
 

Italian footballers
A.C.N. Siena 1904 players
A.S.D. Città di Foligno 1928 players
A.S. Gubbio 1910 players
A.S. Melfi players
Serie C players
Association football forwards
People from Spoleto
Footballers from Umbria
1993 births
Living people
Sportspeople from the Province of Perugia